The 3rd Lombank Trophy was a motor race, run for cars complying with Formula One rules, held on 14 April 1962 at Snetterton Motor Racing Circuit, England. The race was run over 50 laps of the circuit, and was won by British driver Jim Clark in a Lotus 24. 

After Graham Hill had led for the first five laps, Stirling Moss passed him and stretched ahead, his car using the new Coventry Climax V8 engine. However, he experienced throttle problems after 17 laps and had to make a number of pitstops, leaving Clark to dominate the rest of the race. Clark's car was the only other Climax-engined runner to use the new V8 engine.

Prior to the race, two of the entrants withdrew after accidents: Richie Ginther crashed his BRM P57 in testing and suffered injuries which left him unable to race, and Jack Brabham's Lotus 21 had been damaged in a fire at his workshop.

Results

References

 Results at Silhouet.com 
 "The Grand Prix Who's Who", Steve Small, 1995.
 "The Formula One Record Book", John Thompson, 1974, pp 72-73

Lombank Trophy
Lombank Trophy
Lombank
Lombank Trophy